Toyofuji Shipping Co is a roll-on/roll-off shipping company based in Nagoya, Japan and owned by Toyota Group. It has a subsidiary branch in Europe for short sea operations within the region, located in Belgium.

Overview
The company was created in March 1964. It specializes in maritime transport and distribution of cargo such as automobiles, trucks, trailers, Mafi roll trailers, heavy construction machineries and further types of rolling freight.

The main trade lanes covered include domestic transport, from Japan to South East Asia, and from Japan to Australia and New Zealand. These services are performed by a fleet of six smaller ships, and eighteen larger roll-on/roll-off oceanic vessels.

In September 2017, the company announced plans to build and purchase new ships powered by LNG.
 
The company logo is painted on each ship hull, and depicts a blue dolphin shooting three water bubbles.

See also
  Eastern Pacific Shipping
Euro Marine Logistics
EUKOR
Grimaldi Group
KESS - K Line Europe Short Sea
Hyundai Glovis
Nippon Yusen Kaisha
Nissan Motor Car Carrier
Siem Shipping
United European Car Carriers

References

Ships gallery

External links
Official website 

Ro-ro shipping companies
Car carrier shipping companies
Shipping companies of Japan
Toyota Group
Japanese companies established in 1964